Old Weather is an online weather data project that currently invites members of the public to assist in digitising weather observations recorded in US log books dating from the mid-19th  century onwards. It is an example of citizen science that enlists members of the public to help in scientific research. It contributes to the Atmospheric Circulation Reconstructions over the Earth initiative. Data collected by Old Weather has been used by at least five different climate reanalysis projects, including HURDAT, SODA and ECMWF. In February 2013, the project was awarded the Royal Meteorological Society IBM Award for Meteorological Innovation that Matters.

Origins
Old Weather is a Zooniverse project and is a collaboration between researchers at many institutions, including the University of Oxford, Oxford Martin School, ACRE (International Atmospheric Circulation Reconstructions over the Earth), Naval-History.Net of Penarth, Jisc which encourages UK colleges and universities in the innovative use of digital technologies, the National Maritime Museum at Maritime Greenwich, London, and the UK National Archives, Kew, London.

Importance of volunteers
In the past, computer programs have proved unable to read handwriting reliably.
However, it may be worth exploring the current status
of automatic and computer-assisted transcription
and probabilistic indexing
technologies for handwritten text images—also called Handwriting Text Recognition (HTR), Computer Assisted Transcription of Text Images (CATTI) and Keyword Spotting (KWS), respectively).

In any case, the task is much better performed by the human brain and the results transferred to a digital form.
In the site's tutorial, would-be volunteers are shown how to digitise a weather record. Further instructions on how to transcribe the logs are available on the associated Old Weather forum.
It is intended that the pages of the logs are digitised by at least three people. The results will be used to make climate model projections and an improved database of weather extremes.

USRC, USCG and USS log books
Currently, the log books of 2 US vessels are available, each of which have been scanned page by page, and the logs of another 21 vessels have been completed.
More log books will be added at intervals.
The transcriber notes the following from the log books: date, location (or voyage) and weather records, usually consisting of wind direction and strength, weather conditions, cloud type and/or amount of clear sky, barometric pressure and temperature readings. Other log entries, such as refueling figures and sightings of sea-ice, ships, people, landmarks or animals may also be recorded, as well as interesting events.

Progress

Phases I & II
Phase I was launched in October 2010 and all the available Royal Navy logs from that phase and from Phase II have now been completed. By July 23, 2012,
officially, 16,400 volunteers had transcribed the weather data from 1,090,745 pages of the log books of 302 ships. These phases of the  project have generated 1.6 million weather observations.

Phase III
Phase III, consisting of logs from US ships voyaging in the Arctic and worldwide from the mid-1800s onwards, was launched in October 2012 and is now in progress.

Phase IV
Currently, the scope of the project is being extended to include Arctic voyages and expeditions.  Satellite imagery of this region goes back only to the 1950s, but it was explored for 100 years before that (for example the Franklin Expedition).

Results
Initial results of Phase I will be published after data collection is complete and conclusions can be made.

Indeed, the readings are still being assessed at a very broad level. But the distribution of temperature by latitude and wind force by latitude have been plotted for 120,000 results for which three readings have been taken.

Security and political considerations
Because climate change is a very political issue, interested parties could try to corrupt the data by, say, entering temperature figures that are too high or too low. Because three sets of records for each data point will be entered, any set from a digitiser showing a marked deviation from the other records should be easily checkable and eliminated. Large-scale fraud is unlikely because the data is entered one log page at a time, and so is immune to a spam type of attack. Collaborative projects such as Linux and Wikipedia have for the most part been able to rely on the transparent honesty of those taking part.

Accidental errors
Accidental errors, such as reading '4's for '7's are possible, but often context will sort this out. A temperature of 40 °F is unlikely to be correct for a latitude in the tropics and may safely be assumed to be 70 °F.

See also
Zooniverse projects:

References

Notes

External links
 

Citizen science
American science websites
Internet properties established in 2010
Climate and weather statistics
Historical climatology
Meteorological data and networks
Numerical climate and weather models